The 91st 2017 Lunar New Year Cup is the annual edition of the Lunar New Year Cup, held in Hong Kong to celebrate the Lunar New Year in late January 2017. This year, four teams were invited to participate, playing two games each in a knockout tournament. Australia under-23 withdrew before the tournament and were replaced by Auckland City.

Teams
Four teams were invited to participate: Australia under-23 were initially scheduled to participate, however, Football Federation Australia withdrew the side following complaints from A-League clubs about losing players mid-season. They were replaced by Auckland City.
  Kitchee SC (hosts)
  Auckland City
  FC Seoul
  Muangthong United

Squads

Kitchee SC
Manager:  Chu Chi Kwong

Auckland City
Manager:  Ramon Tribulietx

FC Seoul
Manager:  Hwang Sun-hong

Muangthong United
Manager:  Totchtawan Sripan

Fixtures and results
All times are local, HKT (UTC+8).

Semi-finals

Third Place Playoff

Final

Final standing
As per statistical convention in football, matches decided in extra time are counted as wins and losses, while matches decided by penalty shoot-outs are counted as draws.

References

2017
2016–17 in Hong Kong football
January 2017 sports events in China